"More Than a Game" is a song written by Peter Jöback and Lasse Holm, and served as official song for the 1992 UEFA European Championship held in Sweden. Towe Jaarnek and Jöback recorded the song as a duet, and the single peaked at 30th position at the Swedish singles chart. Lyrically, the song deals with being part of a football team, as well as helping/bringing joy each other in life in general.

Charts

References

1992 singles
Football songs and chants
English-language Swedish songs
UEFA Euro 1992
Songs written by Lasse Holm
Songs written by Peter Jöback
1992 songs
UEFA European Championship official songs and anthems